Locomotives built or sold by the Westinghouse Electric Company

Westinghouse's transportation division (rail equipment) was founded 1894 and sold to AEG 1988, later merged into Adtranz and Bombardier. Production of locomotives ended after the early 1950s.

Electric locomotives 
Usually built in partnership with the Baldwin Locomotive Works, see Baldwin-Westinghouse electric locomotives.

Diesel-electric locomotives
Early examples built in partnership with William Beardmore and Company (Beardmore) of Glasgow, Scotland.

Gas Turbine-electric locomotives

In addition, Westinghouse produced and supplied electrical and traction equipment for Baldwin diesel locomotives from 1939 to 1955 and Lima-Hamilton diesels from 1949-1951 until production at Lima, Ohio ended with the merger into Baldwin. Fairbanks-Morse diesels also used Westinghouse electrical and traction equipment.

References

Citations

Sources 

 

 
 
 

 
Westinghouse